The R358 road is a regional road in Ireland linking the N63 at Mountbellew to the R446 at Ballinasloe, all in County Galway.

See also
Roads in Ireland
National primary road
National secondary road

References
Roads Act 1993 (Classification of Regional Roads) Order 2006 – Department of Transport

Regional roads in the Republic of Ireland
Roads in County Galway